Euphorbia tannensis is a species of herb or shrub native to Australia and some Pacific islands.

Description
It grows as an erect annual or perennial herb or shrub, from 10 centimetres to a metre in height, with green or yellow flowers. It often appears spindly due to its leaves being deciduous.

Taxonomy
In 1977 two species, E. eremophila and E. finlaysonii, were submerged within E. tannensis as E. tannensis var. eremophila and E. tannensis var. finlaysonii respectively, these being treated as varieties of a new subspecies, E. tannensis subsp. eremophila.

Distribution and habitat
This species is widespread on the Australian mainland, occurring in every mainland state, though only in the far north-west corner of Victoria (Australia). It is widely reported as occurring only in Australia; yet the type specimen was collected on Tanna in what is now Vanuatu, and it has also been recorded in New Caledonia.

References

tannensis